FC Rilski Sportist (ФК Рилски спортист Самоков) is a Bulgarian football club from the town of Samokov founded in 1947 and currently playing in the South-West Third League. Their home stadium is Iskar Stadium. 

Throughout the majority of its history, Rilski Sportist has competed in the lower levels of Bulgarian football, usually the second, or third tiers. In 2002, however, the team managed to promote to the A Group for the very first time. Their inexperience led to an immediate relegation. Three years later, Rilski Sportist returned to the A Group, only to be relegated again. Since then, the club has been competing mostly in the amateur levels of Bulgarian football.

The club’s nickname is the ‘Skiers’, which originates from the fact that the town of Samokov and nearby Borovets are major resorts for winter sports in Bulgaria.

History 
PFC Rilski Sportist was founded in 1947 after the union of a few smaller teams from Samokov. Throughout much of its history, the team competed in the second or third tiers of Bulgarian football.

In 2002, Sportist achieved its first ever promotion to the Bulgarian elite, then known as A Group, for the 2002–03 season. As expected from a newcomer, Rilski Sportist found it difficult to survive. The team managed to win only one game and finished last, thus being relegated, after just one year among the best.

Three seasons later, the team managed to win the 2005–06 B Group, which enabled them to play in the A PFG for a second time. In their second top-flight season, they won 10 games and earned 30 points. They were the only team which managed to win against Levski in the league in that season. However, they were still 3 points behind 13th placed Spartak Varna, meaning that they were relegated again. The two top flight seasons remain their most important achievement overall. Since then, the team has shifted between the second and third tiers of Bulgarian football. 

In the second division "The Skiers" have 23 participations – 664 matches in total, with 269 wins, 139 draws and 253 losses. Their best result in the Bulgarian Cup has been reaching the quarter-finals in 1950/51 and 2001/02.

"Rilski Sportist" means "Rila sportsman" in Bulgarian.

Crest history

League positions

Honours
A Group (now First League):
 Fourteenth place (2): 2002–03, 2006–07

B Group (now Second League):
 Winners (2): 2001–02, 2005–06

A Regional – Sofia:
 Winners (2): 2010–11, 2013–14

Bulgarian Cup:
 Quarter-final (2): 1951, 2001–02

Current squad 
As of 1 August 2020

Past seasons

Stadium 
Iskar stadium is situated in the southwestern part of Samokov near the biggest park of the city – "Gradski". Built in 1972, the stadium has around 7 000 seating places, most of which are covered. The field measures 105x68 meters. The best attendance was on 31.8.2002 in the match with PFC Levski Sofia – 6 800 spectators.

References

External links
bgclubs.eu

Rilski Sportist
Rilski Sportist
Samokov
1947 establishments in Bulgaria